Fort Zumwalt West High School, the third high school established in the Fort Zumwalt School District, is located in O'Fallon, Missouri. First opened for the 1998–1999 school year, the school now has an approximate enrollment of 2,000 students with an average daily attendance rate of nearly 94%.

Academics

The school's ACT scores averaged 22.1 in 2016, with 98.6% of graduates taking the test due to the statewide free ACT test. The graduation rate remains around 91%, with 42% attending four year college/university, and 32% attending two year college/university. The dropout rate is 1.9%, as opposed to 4.0% at the state level.

With approximately 118 teachers, around 83% have a master's degree or higher, and 100% have regular teaching certificates. They average 9.3 years of teaching experience. There is an average of 17 students per classroom.

The school offers numerous Pre-AP and AP courses such as Calculus, Physics, Chemistry, Government, World and US History, Biology, Literature and Composition and many more.  The 2023 class has four National Merit Scholars.

Sports and activities
The Fort Zumwalt West Women's soccer team won the school's first state title in the 2007 season, and the West dance team won state in 2019.  Teams with Final Four appearances include Girls Basketball, Football, Wrestling, Baseball, and Girls Soccer.  The Dance team was the 2017 Runner-up at the National Dance Competition in Orlando.

Notable alumni 

 2007 – Alyssa Mautz, Chicago Red Stars soccer player
 2008 – Cody Asche, former professional baseball player with the Philadelphia Phillies and Chicago White Sox, and current coach for the Baltimore Orioles
 2009 – T. J. Moe, professional football player formerly with the New England Patriots

References

External links
 Fort Zumwalt West High School

High schools in St. Charles County, Missouri
Educational institutions established in 1998
Public high schools in Missouri
1998 establishments in Missouri